The 2012 Moorilla Hobart International was a tennis tournament played on outdoor hard courts. It was the 19th edition of the event and part of the WTA International tournaments of the 2012 WTA Tour. It took place at the Hobart International Tennis Centre in Hobart, Australia from 6 through 14 January 2012.

Single main-draw entrants

Seeds

1 Rankings are as of 26 December 2011

Other entrants
The following players received wildcards into the singles main draw:
  Ashleigh Barty
  Casey Dellacqua
  Anastasia Rodionova

The following players received entry from the qualifying draw:
  Mona Barthel
  Sacha Jones
  Romina Oprandi
  Heather Watson

The following players received entry from a lucky loser spot:
  Kristina Barrois

Withdrawals
  Anna Chakvetadze (left leg cramp)

Doubles main-draw entrants

Seeds

1 Rankings are as of 26 December 2011

Retirements
  Bethanie Mattek-Sands (neck injury)

Champions

Singles

 Mona Barthel def.  Yanina Wickmayer, 6–1, 6–2
It was Barthel's first career title.

Doubles

 Irina-Camelia Begu /  Monica Niculescu def.  Chuang Chia-jung /  Marina Erakovic, 6–7(4–7), 7–6(7–4), [10–5]

References
Official website

 
Moorilla Hobart International
Moorilla Hobart International
Hobart International